C. Kunchappu Nanu was a member of Kerala Legislative Assembly from Vatakara constituency. He represented Janata Dal (S) party.

Political life
He started his political life as a Congress Sevadal volunteer. He was the secretary and president of State Youth Congress. He was the minister for Forest and Transport from February 2000 to May 2001. Now, he is a member of Janata Dal (S) National Committee. He was elected to the Kerala Legislative Assembly in 1996, 2001, 2011 and 2016.

Personal life
He was born on 6 September 1937 as the son of C. K. Kunchappu and Chirutha. He is married to Malathi and has two sons and a daughter. 13 years ago daughter passed away.

References 

Kerala MLAs 2016–2021
Kerala MLAs 2006–2011
Kerala MLAs 2001–2006
1937 births
Living people
People from Kozhikode district